DJ Muggs Presents: Soul Assassins – Intermission is the third studio album by American hip hop collective Soul Assassins. It was released on June 23, 2009 via Gold Dust Media. Recording sessions took place at the Soul Assassins Compound. Production was handled by DJ Muggs, G. Rocka, Cynic, The Alchemist, DJ Khalil and DJ Solo. It features contributions from Bun B, M-1, Sick Jacken, Evidence, Self Scientific, La Coka Nostra, Necro, Reef the Lost Cauze, OuterSpace, RZA, Reverend William Burke, Planet Asia, B-Real, Prodigy, Twin Gambino, Fashawn, Cynic, Krondon, Dust, Young De, Xzibit and Mykestro.

Track listing

Personnel
Larry "Muggs" Muggerud – arranger, producer (tracks: 1, 5, 9, 10, 13, 14), executive producer
Gonzalo "G-Rocka" Estrada – drum programming (track 1), remixing (track 9), producer (tracks: 8, 11, 15)
Alan "Alchemist" Maman – producer (tracks: 2, 3)
Steve Ferlazzo – keyboards (tracks: 1, 9)
Dave "DJ Solo" Abrams – keyboards (track 1), producer (track 4), scratches (track 9), cover
"DJ Khalil" Abdul-Rahman – producer (tracks: 6, 10)
Richard "Cynic" Alfaro – producer (tracks: 7, 12)
Ernesto "Ern Dog" Medina – recording
Richard "Segal" Huredia – mixing
Rod "King Tech" Sepand – mastering
Tone Lopez – A&R

References

External links

2009 albums
DJ Muggs albums
Soul Assassins albums
Albums produced by DJ Muggs
Albums produced by DJ Khalil
Albums produced by the Alchemist (musician)